The 1980 United States Senate elections were held on November 4, coinciding with Ronald Reagan's victory in the presidential election. The 34 Senate seats of Class 3 were contested in regular elections. Reagan's large margin of victory over incumbent Jimmy Carter gave a huge boost to Republican Senate candidates, allowing them to flip 12 Democratic seats and win control of the chamber for the first time since the end of the 83rd Congress in January 1955. 

This is one of only five occasions where ten or more Senate seats changed hands in an election, with the others being in 1920, 1932, 1946, and 1958. This is the earliest Senate election with a Senator that is still serving, that being Chuck Grassley of Iowa.  

This was the largest Senate swing since 1958, and was the largest Republican gain since 1946, when the Republicans also picked up 12 seats. This was also the last time the Senate changed hands in a presidential election year until 2020 when Democrats won control, the last time the Republicans gained control of the Senate in a presidential election year, and the last time Maryland elected a Republican to the Senate. These elections were also the last time the winner of the presidential election had coattails in the senate until 2004. Warren Magnuson, who lost the Washington election, was the most senior United States senator to ever lose re-election until Ted Stevens lost in 2008.

Results summary

Source: Office of the Clerk

Change in composition

Before the elections

After the elections

Gains, losses, and holds

Retirements
Three Republicans and two Democrats retired instead of seeking re-election.

Defeats
One Republican and twelve Democrats sought re-election but lost in the primary or general election.

Race summary

Special elections 
There were no special elections in 1980.

Elections leading to the next Congress 
In these general elections, the winners were elected for the term beginning January 3, 1981; ordered by state.

All of the elections involved the Class 3 seats.

Closest races 

In nineteen races the margin of victory was under 10%.

Alabama 

Incumbent Democrat Donald Stewart decided to run for his first full term, but was defeated in the primary. In November, Republican Jeremiah Denton defeated Democrat Jim Folsom, Public Service Commissioner.

Alaska

Incumbent Democrat Mike Gravel ran for a third term, but lost in the Democratic primary to Clark Gruening, a former state representative who was the grandson of Ernest Gruening, whom Gravel had defeated twelve years prior in an election for the same seat. Gruening later went on to lose the general election to Republican nominee Frank Murkowski, a banker.

After the loss of Gravel's seat, no Alaska Democrat would win a congressional race again until Mark Begich's narrow, protracted triumph in Alaska's 2008 Senate election.

First elected in 1968, by 1980 two-term Democratic incumbent Mike Gravel had become noted for a filibuster that attempted to end the draft during the Vietnam War and for including the full text of the Pentagon Papers in the Congressional Record.

Gravel faced a challenging bid for re-election, complicated by the fact that his triumph over Ernest Gruening years prior had made him a pariah in the Alaska Democratic Party. Though Gravel had campaigned to be selected as George McGovern's running mate in the 1972 U.S. presidential election and had easily won re-election to the Senate in 1974, he had never established a strong political base in Alaska.

The passage of a controversial land bill earlier in the year, as opposed to a compromise bill worked out by fellow senator Ted Stevens that failed thanks to Gravel two years prior, further harmed his re-election bid. A group of Democrats, including future governor Steve Cowper, campaigned against Gravel on the land bill issue.

The sources of Gravel's campaign funds, some of which came from political action committees outside the state, also became an issue in the contest. Another factor may have been Alaska's blanket primary system, which allows unlimited cross-over voting across parties and from its large unaffiliated electorate; Republicans believed Gruening would be an easier candidate to defeat in the general election. The blanket primary had first been used in the 1968 election, and was something Gravel himself was able to capitalize upon in his 1968 campaign.

Gravel would later comment that by the time of his primary defeat, he had alienated "almost every constituency in Alaska."  In the August 26, 1980, primary Gruening defeated Gravel by 11 percentage points.

Arizona 

Incumbent Republican Barry Goldwater decided to run for reelection to a third consecutive term, after returning to the U.S. Senate in 1968 following his failed Presidential run in 1964 against Lyndon B. Johnson. Goldwater defeated Democratic Party nominee Bill Schulz in the general election, but only by a narrow margin, which later caused Goldwater to decide against running for reelection to a fourth consecutive term.

Arkansas 

Incumbent Democrat Dale Bumpers won re-election to a second term over real estate broker William Clark.

California 

Incumbent Democrat Alan Cranston easily won re-election to a third term over Paul Gann, political activist, even as the state's former Republican governor, Ronald Reagan, claimed a landslide victory in the presidential election.

Colorado 

Incumbent Democrat Gary Hart won re-election to a second term over Mary Estill Buchanan, Colorado Secretary of State.

Connecticut 

Incumbent Democrat Abraham Ribicoff decided to retire. Democrat Chris Dodd won the open seat over James Buckley, former U.S. senator from New York.

Florida 

Incumbent Democrat Richard Stone decided to run for re-election to a second term, but was defeated in the Democratic primary election by Bill Gunter. Republican Paula Hawkins won the open seat.

Stone, a freshman senator, had a reputation for changing his mind. In 1980, the AFL–CIO actively campaigned against him, and Stone was deemed vulnerable in his re-election bid. Six Democrats entered the race for Stone's seat including his 1974 runoff opponent Bill Gunter who was Florida State Treasurer/Insurance Commissioner in 1980. As was the case in 1974, Stone and Gunter were forced into a runoff but, unlike 1974, Gunter won the nomination.

Georgia 

Incumbent Democrat and former Governor of Georgia Herman Talmadge decided to run for re-election to a fifth term, but lost a close race to Mack Mattingly, Chairman of the Georgia Republican Party. 1980 resulted in a landslide election for Republicans that would come to be known as the Reagan Revolution.

Hawaii 

Incumbent Democrat Daniel Inouye was re-elected to a fourth term, defeating Republican Cooper Brown.

Idaho 

Incumbent Democrat Frank Church ran for re-election to a fifth term, but was defeated by Republican Steve Symms, U.S. Congressman.

Illinois 

Incumbent Democrat Adlai Stevenson III decided to retire. Democrat Alan J. Dixon won the open seat, beating Dave O'Neal, Lieutenant Governor of Illinois

Indiana 

Incumbent Democrat Birch Bayh ran for a fourth term, but was defeated by Republican Dan Quayle.

Birch Bayh, the incumbent senator, faced no opposition within the Indiana Democratic Party and avoided a primary election. Bayh was originally elected in 1962 and re-elected in 1968 and 1974. He was Chairman of Senate Intelligence Committee and architect of 25th and 26th Amendments. This election was one of the key races in the country, and signaled a trend that would come to be known as Reagan's coattails, describing the influence Ronald Reagan had in congressional elections.  Incumbent three-term senator Birch Bayh was defeated by over 160,000 votes to Representative Dan Quayle, who would later go on to be Vice President of the United States.

| 
 | colspan=4 | Republican gain from Democratic

Iowa 

Incumbent Democrat John Culver sought re-election to a second term in the Senate, but he was unsuccessful in his bid to do so, falling to Chuck Grassley, the United States Congressman from Iowa's 3rd congressional district, the Republican nominee.

Kansas 

Incumbent Republican Bob Dole won re-election to a third term, defeating Democratic (formerly Republican) State Senator John Simpson.

Kentucky 

Democrat Wendell Ford won re-election, defeating Republican Mary Louise Foust.

Louisiana 

Incumbent Russell B. Long ran for re-election to a seventh and final term, defeating State Representative Woody Jenkins.

Maryland 

Incumbent Republican Charles Mathias ran for re-election to a third term and defeated Democratic State Senator Edward T. Conroy.

Missouri 

Incumbent Democrat Thomas Eagleton won reelection, defeating Republican County Executive of St. Louis County Gene McNary.

Nevada 

Incumbent Republican Paul Laxalt won re-election to a second term over Mary Gojack, former State senator (1974–1978) and former State Assemblywoman (1972–1974).

New Hampshire 

Incumbent Democrat John Durkin was defeated by former Attorney General of New Hampshire Warren Rudman in a relatively close election, where nationwide Republicans would have a landslide election known as the Reagan Revolution.

New York 

Incumbent Republican Jacob K. Javits was defeated in the primary, and Republican Al D'Amato, Presiding Supervisor of the Town of Hempstead,  won the three-way election with Elizabeth Holtzman, U.S. Representative.

Javits's refusal to adjust politically to the rightward movement of his party as well as his 1979 diagnosis with amyotrophic lateral sclerosis (also known as Lou Gehrig's disease) led to a primary challenge. Javits was defeated in the primary by Hempstead Presiding Supervisor Al D'Amato on September 9.

D'Amato, also running on the Conservative line, proceeded to defeat Democratic U.S. Representative Elizabeth Holtzman and Javits, who ran on the Liberal Party ticket. In the traditionally liberal state of New York, Javits split the Democratic vote with Holtzman to give D'Amato a close victory.

North Carolina 

Incumbent Democrat Robert Morgan lost re-election a second term to Republican John East, Professor at East Carolina University.

North Dakota 

Incumbent Republican Milton Young was retiring.  Republican Mark Andrews defeated North Dakota Democratic-NPL Party candidate Kent Johanneson to fill the vacated seat.

Andrews, who had served as a Representative since 1965, easily received the Republican nomination, and the endorsed Democratic-NPL candidate was Kent Johanneson. Andrews and Johanneson won the primary elections for their respective parties.

Two independent candidates, Harley McLain and Don J. Klingensmith also filed before the deadline under the Chemical Farming Banned and Statesman parties respectively. McLain would later run for the same seat in 1998 against then incumbent Byron Dorgan.

Ohio 

Incumbent Democrat John Glenn won re-election to a second term in a landslide with 69% of the vote over Jim Betts, State Representative, coinciding with Ronald Reagan's substantial win in the state during the presidential election.

Oklahoma 

Incumbent Republican Henry Bellmon decided to retire, instead of seeking a third term. Republican nominee Don Nickles won the open seat over Andy Coats, Oklahoma County, Oklahoma district attorney.

After two years in the State Senate and displeased by the policies of the Carter Administration, Nickles ran for the United States Senate in 1980 to succeed Republican Henry Bellmon who was retiring. As an unknown in a field crowded with business and political bigwigs, Nickles was not initially given much of a chance. Bellmon even tried to convince him to wait and run for the U.S. House. Utilizing personal contact and passing out unique "wooden nickel" campaign button novelties, Nickles unique grassroot community ties to local Amway distributors throughout Oklahoma gave him an interpersonal network which proved helpful. Nickles beat two well funded oil millionaires (Jack Zink and Ed Noble) in the primary and won the primary run-off against Zink, a race car driver. He later won the general election against Democrat Oklahoma City Mayor Andy Coats and independent Charles Nesbitt, the Oklahoma Corporation Commissioner and former Oklahoma Attorney General. At the age of 32, Nickles was the youngest Republican ever elected to the United States Senate.

Oregon 

Republican incumbent Bob Packwood was re-elected to a third term, defeating Democratic state senator Ted Kulongoski and Libertarian Tonie Nathan.

The primary elections were held on May 20, 1980, in conjunction with the Democratic and Republican presidential primaries. The eruption (which was a VEI = 5 event) was the first significant one to occur in the contiguous 48 U.S. states since the 1915 eruption of California's Lassen Peak.

In addition to the candidates chosen in the primaries, Tonie Nathan was chosen as the Libertarian Party candidate at that party's convention in June. Previously, Nathan had been the Libertarian vice presidential candidate in the 1972 Presidential election and was the first woman to ever receive an electoral vote in a U.S. presidential election from a faithless elector who voted for her.

As a well-funded incumbent, Packwood was expected to have a fairly easy road to re-election and led by double digit margins in most early polls. Packwood chose defense spending as his key issue in the campaign while Kulongoski focused on the economy and unemployment. Nathan hammered at core Libertarian principles of limited government, with a goal of 5% of votes which would keep the party as a valid minor party. The three candidates agreed to three debates, to be held across the state in the summer of 1980. As the challenger, Kulongoski aggressively attempted to engage Packwood in the debates, but the debate format did not allow the candidates to ask follow-up questions or rebut each other's statements and Packwood was largely able to avoid confrontation and stay above the fray. As the campaign wore on, Kulongoski grew more confident and tried to appeal to Oregonians' independent values by saying that Packwood's enormous cash advantage was due to "eastern" money.

Kulongoski closed to within a few points in some late polls, but with no mistakes made by Packwood and with the coattail effect of Ronald Reagan's presidential victory, the incumbent achieved an electoral majority and a fairly comfortable 8-point margin over Kulongoski. Nathan finished with less than 4% of the vote, short of her goal of 5%. With Republicans taking control of the U.S. Senate, Packwood was in line to become chairman of the Senate Commerce Committee. Fellow Oregon Republican senator Mark Hatfield was also elevated to chairman of the Senate Appropriations Committee, giving Oregon power in the Senate it had never seen before.

Pennsylvania 

Incumbent Republican Richard Schweiker decided to retire, instead of seeking a third term. Republican nominee Arlen Specter won the open seat, defeating Democratic nominee Peter F. Flaherty, former Mayor of Pittsburgh.

Arlen Specter, formerly a member of the Democratic party, had served as legal counsel to the Warren Commission, which investigated the 1963 assassination of President John F. Kennedy, after which he became District Attorney of Philadelphia. After he was defeated in a 1967 run for Mayor of Philadelphia, Specter was defeated in his bid for a third term as district attorney. He had run in the Republican primary in the 1976 Senate election, but was defeated by John Heinz and also ran in the 1978 gubernatorial election, but was defeated by Dick Thornburgh in the primary. Shortly after Specter opened a law practice in Atlantic City, New Jersey, incumbent Republican Richard Schweiker unexpectedly announced his decision not to seek re-election to his seat. Specter, believing his reputation as a political moderate would help him in the general election, decided to run. In the Republican primary, Specter faced state senator Edward Howard, as well as Delaware County councilman Bud Haabestad, who was endorsed by Schweiker, then-governor Thornburgh and John Heinz. Specter ultimately defeated Haabestad, his most prominent challenger, by approximately 37,000 votes.

In the Democratic primary, former Pittsburgh mayor Peter Flaherty contended with State Representative Joseph Rhodes Jr., former U.S. Representative Edward Mezvinsky, State senator H. Craig Lewis and Dean of Temple University Law School Peter J. Liacouras. Flaherty's name recognition enabled him to defeat his primary opponents, winning every county and thus winning the Democratic nomination.

Flaherty employed a general election strategy he had used in two previous statewide office campaigns: win by a wide margin in the southwestern part of the state and narrowly win Philadelphia. He also hoped to carry several swing towns on account of his support from several labor unions. Specter hoped to carry his home town of Philadelphia, despite the Democrats' 7–2 voter registration advantage there. To this end, Specter sought endorsements among city Democratic leadership, including future mayor John F. Street. Specter hoped that, with wins in suburban areas and the heavily Republican central portion of the state in addition to winning Philadelphia, he would be able to win the election. Specter distanced himself from Governor Dick Thornburgh, who had become unpopular in some demographics due to his proposals to decrease welfare program spending.

In the end, Specter defeated Flaherty by approximately 108,000 votes, carrying Philadelphia and its suburbs as well as the central and northeastern portions of the state. Flaherty performed strongest in the western portion of the state, including Cambria, Clarion, Erie and Mercer counties.

South Carolina 

Incumbent Democratic senator Fritz Hollings easily defeated Republican challenger Marshall Mays to win his fourth (his third full) term.

South Dakota 

Incumbent Democrat George McGovern ran for re-election to a fourth term, but was defeated by Republican James Abdnor, U.S. Representative.

McGovern was one of several liberal Democratic U.S. senators targeted for defeat in 1980 by the National Conservative Political Action Committee (NCPAC), which put out a year's worth of negative portrayals of McGovern.  They and other anti-abortion groups especially focused on McGovern's support for pro-choice abortion laws.  McGovern faced a Democratic primary challenge for the first time, from an anti-abortion candidate.

Abdnor, a four-term incumbent congressman who held identical positions to McGovern on farm issues, was solidly conservative on national issues, and was well liked within the state. Abdnor's campaign focused on both McGovern's liberal voting record and what it said was McGovern's lack of involvement in South Dakotan affairs.  McGovern made an issue of NCPAC's outside involvement, and that group eventually withdrew from the campaign after Abdnor denounced a letter they had sent out.  Far behind in the polls earlier, McGovern outspent Abdnor 2-to-1, hammered away at Abdnor's refusal to debate him (drawing attention to a slight speech defect Abdnor had), and, showing the comeback pattern of some of his past races in the state, closed the gap for a while.

However, in the general election McGovern was solidly defeated, getting only 39 percent of the vote to Abdnor's 58 percent.  McGovern became one of many Democratic casualties of that year's Republican sweep, which became known as the "Reagan Revolution".

Utah 

Incumbent Republican Jake Garn ran successfully for reelection to a second term in the United States Senate, defeating Democrat Dan Berman.

Vermont 

Incumbent Democrat Patrick Leahy ran successfully for reelection to a second term in the United States Senate, defeating Stewart M. Ledbetter in what was the closest race of his Senatorial career.

Washington 

Incumbent Democrat Warren Magnuson lost re-election to State Attorney General Slade Gorton.

Wisconsin 

Incumbent Democrat Gaylord Nelson ran for re-election to a fourth term, but was defeated by Bob Kasten, Former U.S. Representative from Wisconsin's 9th congressional district (1975–1979).

See also
 1980 United States elections
 1980 United States gubernatorial elections
 1980 United States presidential election
 1980 United States House of Representatives elections
 96th United States Congress
 97th United States Congress

Notes

References

Sources 
 
 

 
November 1980 events in the United States